An electronic symbol is a pictogram used to represent various electrical and electronic devices or functions, such as wires, batteries, resistors, and transistors, in a schematic diagram of an electrical or electronic circuit.  These symbols are largely standardized internationally today, but may vary from country to country, or engineering discipline, based on traditional conventions.

Standards for symbols
The graphic symbols used for electrical components in circuit diagrams are covered by national and international standards, in particular:
 IEC 60617 (also known as BS 3939).
 There is also IEC 61131-3 – for ladder-logic symbols.
 JIC JIC (Joint Industrial Council) symbols as approved and adopted by the NMTBA (National Machine Tool Builders Association). They have been extracted from the Appendix of the NMTBA Specification EGPl-1967.
 ANSI Y32.2-1975 (also known as IEEE Std 315-1975 or CSA Z99-1975).
 IEEE Std 91/91a: graphic symbols for logic functions (used in digital electronics). It is referenced in ANSI Y32.2/IEEE Std 315. 
 Australian Standard AS 1102 (based on a slightly modified version of IEC 60617; withdrawn without replacement with a recommendation to use IEC 60617).

The number of standards leads to confusion and errors.
Symbols usage is sometimes unique to engineering disciplines, and national or local variations to international standards exist. For example, lighting and power symbols used as part of architectural drawings may be different from symbols for devices used in electronics.

Common electronic symbols
Symbols shown are typical examples, not a complete list.

Traces

Grounds
The shorthand for ground is GND.  Optionally, the triangle in the middle symbol may be filled in.

Sources

Resistors

It is very common for potentiometer and rheostat symbols to be used for many types of variable resistors, including trimmers.

Capacitors

Diodes

Optionally, the triangle in these symbols may be filled in.  Note: The words anode and cathode typically aren't part of the diode symbols.

Bridge rectifiers

There are many ways to draw a single-phase bridge rectifier symbol.  Some show the internal diode circuit, some don't.

Inductors

Transformers

Transistors

Optionally, transistor symbols may include a circle.  Note: The pin letters B/C/E and G/D/S aren't part of the transistor symbols.

Bipolar

Unipolar

Vacuum tubes

Switches

Relays

Note: The pin letters aren't part of the symbols.

Lamps
LED is located in diode section.

Current limiters

Electro-acoustic devices

Antennas

Cables

Connectors

ICs

Logic gates

For the symbols below: A and B are inputs, Q is output.  Note: These letters are not part of the symbols.

There are variations of these logic gate symbols.  Depending on the IC, the two-input gates below may have: 1) two or more inputs; 2) infrequently some have a second inverted  output too.

The above logic symbols may have additional I/O variations too: 1) schmitt trigger inputs, 2) tri-state outputs, 3) open-collector or open-drain outputs (not shown).

Flip-flops

For the symbols below: Q is output,  is inverted output, E is enable input, internal triangle shape is clock input, S is Set, R is Reset (some datasheets use clear (CLR) instead of reset along the bottom).

There are variations of these flip-flop symbols.  Depending on the IC, a flip-flop may have: 1) one or both outputs (Q only,  only, both Q & ); 2) one or both forced inputs along top & bottom (R only, S only, both R & S); 3) some inputs may be inverted.

OpAmps
Note: The outside text isn't part of these symbols.

Oscillators

Miscellaneous devices

Historical electronic symbols
The shape of some electronic symbols have changed over time.  The following historical electronic symbols can be found in old electronic books / magazines / schematics, and now considered obsolete.

Capacitors (historical)
All of the following are obsolete capacitor symbols.

See also

 Circuit diagram
 Reference designator
 Symbols for appliance classes

References

Further reading
 Beginner's Guide to Reading Schematics; 4th Ed; Stan Gibilisco; McGraw-Hill, 224 pages; 2018; .
 How to Read Electronic Circuit Diagrams; 2nd Ed; Brown, Lawrence, Whitson; Tab Books; 214 pages; 1988; .
 How to Read Schematic Diagrams; 4th Ed; Donald Herrington; Sams Publishing; 160 pages; 1986; . (2nd Ed in 1967)
 Engineer's Mini-Notebook : Schematic Symbols, Device Packages, Design and Testing; 1st Ed; Forrest M. Mims III; Radio Shack; 48 pages; 1988.

External links

IEEE Standard American National Standard Canadian Standard Graphic Symbols for Electrical and Electronics Diagrams (Including Reference Designation Letters)
IEC 60617 : Graphical Symbols for Diagrams (2012) - International standard
MIL-STD-806B : Graphical Symbols for Logic Diagrams (1962) - U.S. DoD standard

Electronic engineering
Pictograms